The striated lorikeet, lori strié, or lori estriado (Synorhacma multistriata) is a species of parrot in the family Psittaculidae native to New Guinea. It is the only species placed in the genus Synorhacma. It is threatened by habitat loss.

Taxonomy
The striated lorikeet was formally described in 1911 by the English zoologist Walter Rothschild under the binomial name Charmosynopsis multistriata. The species was formerly placed in the genus Charmosyna but was moved to a new monotypic genus Synorhacma based on phylogenetic studies of the lorikeets published in 2020. The name Synorhacma is an anagram of Charmosyna.

Distribution and habitat 
The species is native to mountain forests of the central mountain ranges in West Papua (province), Indonesia and central Papua New Guinea (particularly the Ok Tedi River region). It is believed to be possibly nomadic.

Conservation 
The striated lorikeet's habitat is greatly threatened by deforestation to make way for farms and mines (especially copper and gold), and is also believed to be under pressure from recent severe weather events.

References

striated lorikeet
Birds of New Guinea
striated lorikeet
Taxonomy articles created by Polbot
Taxobox binomials not recognized by IUCN